Douglas Scott may refer to:
 Douglas Scott (designer) (1913–1990), designer of the London Routemaster double-decker bus
 Douglas Scott (politician) (1920–2012), Australian politician
 Douglas Scott (writer) (born 1926), writer of thrillers
 Doug Scott (1941–2020), British mountaineer
 Doug Scott (Canadian football) (born 1955), CFL player
 Douglas P. Scott (born 1960), mayor of Rockford, Illinois, United States
 Douglas D. Scott, American archaeologist
 George Douglas Scott or Doug Scott, chairman of TEDCO
 Douglas Scott (choreographer), American choreographer